Keamari Town lies in the southern part of the city that was named after the historic seaside municipality of Keamari. Kemari Town was formed in 2001 as part of The Local Government Ordinance 2001, and was subdivided into 11 union councils. The town system was disbanded in 2011, and Kemari Town was re-organized as part of Karachi West District in 2015.

In 2020, Keamari District was carved out from Karachi West District. So Kemari Town ended up being part of Kemari District.

Location 
Kemari Town comprised the western parts of Karachi, including the Port of Karachi and an extensive coastline of sandy beaches, small islands and Mangrove forests. It does not include the southern island of Manora, which is administered by the Pakistani military as Manora Cantonment, because of the naval base located there. The town formed a large triangle with defined boundaries: the RCD Highway and the Lyari River form the northeastern border, the Hub River to the northwestern border, and the Arabian Sea formed the southern border.

History 
The federal government introduced local government reforms in the year 2000, which eliminated the previous "third tier of government" (administrative divisions) and replaced it with the fourth tier (districts).

2001 
The effect in Karachi was the dissolution of the former Karachi Division in 2001, and the merging of its five districts to form a new Karachi City-District with eighteen autonomous constituent towns including Kemari Town.

2011 
In 2011, the system was disbanded but remained in place for bureaucratic administration until 2015, when the Karachi Metropolitan Corporation system was reintroduced.

2015 
In 2015, Kemari Town was re-organized as part of Karachi West district.

2020 
In 2020, Keamari District was made after splitting Karachi West District. Now, Kemari Town is part of Keamari District.

Keamari District 
Keamari District is an administrative district of Karachi Division in Sindh, Pakistan. Kemari District is created after splitting Karachi West District.

Administrative Towns of Kemari 
Following is the list of four administrative towns of Kemari District.

 Keamari Town
 Baldia Town
 Site Town
 Karachi Fish Harbour

See also 

Keamari District
Keamari Locality

References

External links 
 Karachi Website
 Kiamari Town

Pakistan Navy bases
 
 
Towns in Karachi